Mass Appeal: The Best of Gang Starr is a greatest hits album by hip hop duo Gang Starr released by Virgin/EMI Records on December 26, 2006. It is named after the popular Gang Starr song "Mass Appeal," which is one of the eighteen tracks on the album. The limited-edition version of this album contains two bonus tracks on the first disc and a bonus disc with 11 music videos in DVD format. The music videos range are taken from all Gang Starr albums excluding No More Mr. Nice Guy and are arranged in chronological order. The tracks on disc one are not arranged in chronological order but are taken from every Gang Starr album. Mass Appeal: Best of Gang Starr differs from the group's first greatest hits compilation, Full Clip: A Decade of Gang Starr, because it contains a bonus disc of music videos and it contains tracks from The Ownerz. Also, there are no previously unreleased tracks on Mass Appeal excluding the two bonus tracks, which appeared on the Japanese version of The Ownerz.

Track listing

Disc 1
 "Manifest"
 "Step In The Arena"
 "Put Up Or Shut Up" (featuring Krumbsnatcha)
 "Skills"
 "Code Of The Streets"
 "Ex Girl To Next Girl"
 "Soliloquy Of Chaos"
 "The Militia" (featuring Big Shug & Freddie Foxxx)
 "Above The Clouds" (featuring Inspectah Deck)
 "Check The Technique"
 "Royalty" (featuring K-Ci & JoJo)
 "Lovesick"
 "Take It Personal"
 "Now You're Mine"
 "Just To Get A Rep" (Short Version)
 "B.Y.S."
 "Mass Appeal"
 "DWYCK" (featuring Nice & Smooth)
 "Natural" (Bonus Track)
 "Tha Squeeze" (Bonus Track)

Limited Edition DVD
 "Step In the Arena"
 "Just to Get a Rep"
 "Ex Girl to Next Girl"
 "Take It Personal"
 "Code of the Streets"
 "Mass Appeal"
 "The Militia"
 "Full Clip"
 "Discipline" (featuring Total)
 "Nice Girl, Wrong Place"
 "Skillz"

References

Hip hop compilation albums
Gang Starr albums
Albums produced by DJ Premier
2006 greatest hits albums
2006 video albums
Music video compilation albums
Virgin Records compilation albums
Virgin Records video albums